The Belarusian Socialist Assembly, BSA (BSH) was a revolutionary party in the Belarusian territory of the Russian Empire. It was established in 1902 as the Belarusian Revolutionary Party, renamed in 1903.

The BSA had branches in Minsk, Vilnius and Saint Petersburg. After the February Revolution in Russia, the political activity in Belarus increased, and in summer of 1917 the BSA gave rise to the Communist Party of Byelorussia and the Belarusian Social Democratic Party.

On March 19, 1918, on the initiative of the BSA, the Rada of the Belarusian Democratic Republic became a temporary, short-lived parliament in the Belarusian Democratic Republic. Most of the BNR Council were members of the BSA.

Russian Bolsheviks had a negative attitude towards the BSA. Vladimir Lenin described BSA as a "nationalist petite bourgeoisie party of left-populist orientation". The 2nd Congress of the Soviets of the Western Province (Russia) declared the Council of the Belarusian People's Republic counter-revolutionary and anti-Soviet.

After the Polish-Soviet War, many activists of the BSA have found themselves in Poland, which acquired Western Belarus, and they struggled for the Belarusian autonomy.

Notable members
 Vaclau Lastouski, politician and historian
Jazep Losik, academic and member of the Rada of the Belarusian Democratic Republic
Jazep Mamońka, politician and member of the Rada of the Belarusian Democratic Republic
 Alaiza Pashkevich, writer
 Jan Sierada, politician
 Branislaŭ Taraškievič, linguist
 Vasil Zacharka, the second president of the Belarusian People's Republic
 Paluta Badunova, politician, the only woman at the Council (Rada) of the Belarusian Democratic Republic
Fabijan Šantyr, poet

References

1900s in Belarus
1910s in Belarus
Defunct political parties in Belarus
Belarusian independence movement
Belarusian National Republic
Political parties established in 1902
Political parties disestablished in 1918
Political parties of minorities in Imperial Russia
Political parties of the Russian Revolution
Socialist parties in Belarus